"Oh Happy Day" is a 1967 gospel song.

Oh Happy Day may also refer to:

 "Oh Happy Day" (1952 song), the pop song made famous by Don Howard and Larry Hooper
 Oh Happy Day (Don Patterson album), 1969
 Oh Happy Day (Glen Campbell album), 1970
 Oh Happy Day: An All-Star Music Celebration, a 2009 gospel compilation album
 "O Happy Day", a 1755 hymn by Philip Doddridge

See also
 Happy Day (disambiguation)
 Happy Days (disambiguation)